1414 Jérôme, provisional designation , is a carbonaceous Dorian asteroid from the central region of the asteroid belt, approximately 16 kilometers in diameter. It was discovered on 12 February 1937 by, French astronomer Louis Boyer at Algiers Observatory, Algeria, in northern Africa, and named after his father Jérôme Boyer.

Orbit and classification 

Jérôme is a member of the Dora family, a well-established central asteroid family of more than 1,200 carbonaceous asteroids. The family's namesake is 668 Dora. It is alternatively known as the "Zhongolovich family", named after its presumably largest member 1734 Zhongolovich. The Dora family may also contain a subfamily.

Jérôme orbits the Sun in the middle main-belt at a distance of 2.3–3.2 AU once every 4 years and 8 months (1,697 days). Its orbit has an eccentricity of 0.16 and an inclination of 9° with respect to the ecliptic. The body's observation arc starts with its official discovery observation, as no precoveries were taken and no prior identifications were made.

Physical characteristics 

Jérôme is a dark C-type asteroid, classified as a hydrated Ch-subtype in the SMASS classification scheme.

According to the surveys carried out by the Infrared Astronomical Satellite IRAS and NASA's Wide-field Infrared Survey Explorer with its subsequent NEOWISE mission, Jérôme measures 15.1 and 17.2 kilometers in diameter, and its surface has an albedo of 0.065 and 0.054, respectively. It has an absolute magnitude of 13.1.

Lightcurves 

As of 2017, Jérômes rotation period, spin axis and shape remains unknown.

Naming 

This minor planet was named by the discoverer in honour of his father, Jérôme Boyer. Naming citation was first mentioned in The Names of the Minor Planets by Paul Herget in 1955.

References

External links 
 Asteroid Lightcurve Database (LCDB), query form (info )
 Dictionary of Minor Planet Names, Google books
 Asteroids and comets rotation curves, CdR – Observatoire de Genève, Raoul Behrend
 Discovery Circumstances: Numbered Minor Planets (1)-(5000) – Minor Planet Center
 
 

 

001414
Discoveries by Louis Boyer (astronomer)
Named minor planets
001414
19370212